The 1991–92 Pittsburgh Panthers men's basketball team represented the University of Pittsburgh in the 1991–92 NCAA Division I men's basketball season. Led by head coach Paul Evans, the Panthers finished with a record of 18–16. They received an invite to the 1992 National Invitation Tournament where they lost in the second round to Florida.

References

Pittsburgh Panthers men's basketball seasons
Pittsburgh
Pittsburgh Pan
Pittsburgh Pan